Astrothelium flavoduplex is a species of corticolous (bark-dwelling), crustose lichen in the family Trypetheliaceae. Found in Brazil, it was formally described as a new species in 2016 by lichenologists André Aptroot and Marcela Cáceres. The type specimen was collected by the authors in the Parque Natural Municipal de Porto Velho (Porto Velho, Rondônia), where it was found growing on a twig in a low-altitude primary rainforest. The thallus contains lichexanthone, a lichen product that causes the thallus surface to fluoresce yellow when lit with a long-wavelength UV light. The use of thin-layer chromatography on collected samples revealed the presence of an anthraquinone compound, possibly parietin. Astrothelium mesoduplex is similar in appearance, but that species lacks lichexanthone, and has shorter ascospores.

References

flavoduplex
Lichen species
Lichens described in 2016
Taxa named by André Aptroot
Taxa named by Marcela Cáceres
Lichens of North Brazil